Oxford is a small town serving the farming community of North Canterbury, New Zealand. Originally, it was served by the Oxford Branch railway, and had two stations, East Oxford and West Oxford. The line closed in 1959 and was dismantled. Some railway signs and the remnants of railway platforms can still be seen along Oxford Road on the way to Rangiora.

It was originally a logging town: trees were felled from forests in the area, and hauled by beast to Christchurch. A mural depicting life from that era is painted on the side wall of the butchers shop.

Oxford has won awards for the most beautiful village and the most beautiful toilet.

Geography 

Oxford is located at the inland edge of the Canterbury Plains, approximately 50 km northwest of Christchurch. The township is about 30 km from Rangiora to the East, and the townships of Sheffield and Darfield to the west.

The climate of Oxford is warm and temperate. Snowfalls are rare, but surrounding hills get snowfall on an annual basis.

Naming
It is unclear whether the town is named after Oxford in England or after its university, but it is more probable that it was named after Samuel Wilberforce, who was the Bishop of Oxford from 1845 to 1870. It was named by the chief surveyor of the Canterbury Association, Joseph Thomas, in 1849.

The town of Tīrau in the North Island was originally also named Oxford, in a name pairing with Cambridge 30 km to the west. Owing to confusion between the two towns, the North Island town was later renamed Oxford North before adopting its current name in 1895.

Education
The town has one school, Oxford Area School. It is a state composite (Year 1–13) school with a role of

Demographics 

Oxford had a population of 2,214 at the 2018 New Zealand census, an increase of 285 people (14.8%) since the 2013 census, and an increase of 486 people (28.1%) since the 2006 census. There were 858 households. There were 1,068 males and 1,146 females, giving a sex ratio of 0.93 males per female. The median age was 45.1 years (compared with 37.4 years nationally), with 456 people (20.6%) aged under 15 years, 309 (14.0%) aged 15 to 29, 909 (41.1%) aged 30 to 64, and 540 (24.4%) aged 65 or older.

Ethnicities were 95.3% European/Pākehā, 6.6% Māori, 0.9% Pacific peoples, 1.5% Asian, and 2.2% other ethnicities (totals add to more than 100% since people could identify with multiple ethnicities).

The proportion of people born overseas was 19.8%, compared with 27.1% nationally.

Although some people objected to giving their religion, 52.6% had no religion, 36.2% were Christian, 0.1% were Hindu, 0.1% were Buddhist and 2.0% had other religions.

Of those at least 15 years old, 234 (13.3%) people had a bachelor or higher degree, and 435 (24.7%) people had no formal qualifications. The median income was $26,900, compared with $31,800 nationally. The employment status of those at least 15 was that 729 (41.5%) people were employed full-time, 288 (16.4%) were part-time, and 54 (3.1%) were unemployed.

Community 

The community saved hard during 2005 and 2006 to raise funds for projects such as the Oxford Community Pool, a community-based swimming pool in Burnett Street, and a first-response ambulance. The town prides itself on its ability to self-fund community projects through organizations such as the Lions.

Oxford has several Churches and organisations:

Oxford Union Church (Presbyterian)
Oxford Baptist Church
Sacred Heart Catholic Church
Seventh Day Adventist Church
Anglican Church
Tawera Masonic Lodge
Oxford Working Men’s Club
West Oxford Hotel (Public House - The West)

Notable people 
 

Joseph Pawelka (1887–?), New Zealand criminal and prison escaper
Bernard Sladden (1879–1961), farmer, wildlife ranger, historian and naturalist
Jo Seagar chef

Transport
Oxford was linked to Christchurch in 1878 by the narrow-gauge Oxford Branch from Oxford West to Rangiora to meet the broad gauge from Christchurch. With the gauge conversion of 1878, it became easier to transfer passengers and freight from the branch line to Christchurch, though passengers still had to change at Rangiora from the Waipara train to the branch train. The branch stretched from Rangiora through Bennetts Junction (where the Eyreton Branch joined), Oxford and Sheffield. This necessitated a high road-rail bridge across the Waimakariri Gorge.

From Oxford to Sheffield closed in 1931 along with the Eyreton Branch, leaving the Oxford branch as a rural branch line. It lost its passenger service in the 1940s. Due to declining revenue, the branch closed on 31 May 1959 and the track was sold to Scotts Engineering of Christchurch, which used the rails from several branch lines to build farm sheds.

The line was latterly worked by the A and AB class 4-6-2 and C class 2-6-2 tender locomotives. No diesel locomotives or railcars are known to have used the branch, although thought was given in the 1940s to running a small railcar.

Oxford Benevolent and Improvement League 

The OB&I was formed during World War I to provide charitable support to war widows. To raise money, it showed films in the old Oxford Town Hall. It provides charitable support to the citizens of Oxford. Movies are screened in the Town Hall approximately every other Saturday during the winter. The heyday of the OB&I movies was the middle of the 20th century, when three or four films would be shown every week and queues often extended around the building. This was before private car ownership became popular, as the nearest cinema was in Christchurch, some 50 km distant.

The Oxford Town hall, where movies were shown, was closed, along with several other Council operated buildings, in late 2011, as the building was determined to be earthquake prone. The Oxford Town hall was reopened on 19 February 2015.

Renovation of Main Street 

During 2009, Main Street underwent a major renovation with the road resurfaced, pedestrian refuges in strategic locations and new footpaths with garden beds. The old welcome signs were replaced with new "Experience Oxford" signs at east and west entries. This project was a joint undertaking by the Waimakariri District Council and the Oxford Promotions and Action Committee (OPAC), but they ran out of money and did not finish both sides of the street.

Books about Oxford
There are a number of books about Oxford.

Littledene: a New Zealand rural community published in 1938 is perhaps the most comprehensive; the book is a "sociological study of a typical New Zealand small town", with the fictional name of Littledene, but the research and details of the book all relate to Oxford.

References

External links 

Oxford website
Somerset, H. C. D. (1938). Littledene: A New Zealand rural community. Wellington: New Zealand Council for Educational Research.

Waimakariri District
Populated places in Canterbury, New Zealand